Down the Way is the second studio album by Australian singer-songwriter duo Angus & Julia Stone. It was released on 12 March 2010 in Australia through EMI Music Australia and debuted at number 1 on the ARIA Charts.

The physical CD release (including an untitled bonus track appended to track 13) was released in two formats: standard CD jewel case or deluxe version with gold embossed text on a ribbon-tied, peach-coloured, fabric covered digipak hard-book which includes the additional Red Berries bonus disc and a 20-page lyric book. Red Berries is a collection of bonus tracks from the previous EPs and includes one previously unreleased track "This Way". The song "Santa Monica Dream" was also featured in the 2015 video game Life Is Strange.

At the ARIA Music Awards of 2010, the album won the ARIA Award for Album of the Year, Best Adult Alternative Album, Best Cover Art while Angus and Julia won the ARIA Award for Producer of the Year for their work on this album.

At the J Awards of 2010, the album was nominated for Australian Album of the Year.

Track listing

Charts

Weekly charts

Year-end charts

Decade-end charts

Certifications

Release history

References

2010 albums
ARIA Award-winning albums
Angus & Julia Stone albums